A Tale of Two Kitties is a 1942 Warner Bros. Merrie Melodies cartoon directed by Bob Clampett, written by Warren Foster, and features music by Carl W. Stalling. The short was released on November 21, 1942, and features the debut of Tweety, originally named Orson until his second cartoon, who delivers the line that would become his catchphrase: "I tawt I taw a puddy tat!"

The short was reissued as a Blue Ribbon cartoon on July 31, 1948.

Plot
Two cats, Babbit and Catstello, are looking for food to alleviate their hunger. Babbit gets a ladder when they see a bird. Catstello is at first reluctant, but manages to go up the ladder, where he broke the fourth wall and made a direct jab at the movie industry's self censorship bureau by making a reference to the middle finger ("If the Hays Office would only let me, I'd give him the 'boid,' all right!"). After several failed attempts, Babbit and Catstello construct a makeshift glider and try to swoop down and catch the bird, but the bird reports an air raid, followed by a blackout, and Catstello is shot down. The bird walks by acting as an air raid warden and demanding a "total bwackout", and just as Babbit and Catstello are about to catch him, the bird screams at the cats to turn out the lights.

Voice cast
Mel Blanc as Catstello, Tweety
Tedd Pierce as Babbit

See also
 List of films in the public domain in the United States
 List of animated films in the public domain in the United States

References

External links
 
 
 
 A Tale of Two Kitties at Cinemaniacal

1940s English-language films
1942 short films
1942 animated films
1940s animated short films
1940s Warner Bros. animated short films
American animated short films
Merrie Melodies short films
Articles containing video clips
Tweety films
Films about real people
Animation based on real people
Cultural depictions of Abbott and Costello
Animated films about cats
Animated films set in the United States
Films directed by Bob Clampett
Films produced by Leon Schlesinger
Films scored by Carl Stalling
Warner Bros. Cartoons animated short films